Ahmed Farid Abou-Shadi (born 28 November 1909, date of death unknown) was an Egyptian sabre fencer who competed in the individual and team sabre events at the 1948 and 1952 Summer Olympics. He was born in Shibin Al Kawm, Al Minufiyah, Egypt. He competed at the age of 42 years, 246 days in 1952, and holds the record as the oldest Egyptian Olympic fencer.

References

External links
 

1909 births
Year of death missing
Egyptian male sabre fencers
Olympic fencers of Egypt
Fencers at the 1948 Summer Olympics
Fencers at the 1952 Summer Olympics